Sir Frank Cecil Meyer, 2nd Baronet (7 May 1886 – 19 October 1935) was a British businessman and Conservative Party politician.

Personal life

The son of German-born businessman Sir Carl and Adele Meyer, Meyer was also successful in business, becoming vice-chairman of the De Beers diamond cartel. He was educated at New College, Oxford and served in the First World War with the Essex Yeomanry and the Signal Corps, being mentioned in dispatches. He was elected as MP for Great Yarmouth in 1924, but lost his seat in 1929. His son, Anthony Meyer, was also a Conservative MP. Anthony Meyer inherited his father's title at the age of fifteen when Frank Meyer died in a hunting accident.

Career

At the 1924 general election, he was elected as Member of Parliament (MP) for Great Yarmouth in Norfolk, defeating the Liberal MP Sir Arthur Harbord.  Harbord retook the seat at the 1929 general election, and Meyer never re-entered Parliament.

Arms

References

External links 

1886 births
Baronets in the Baronetage of the United Kingdom
British Jews
English people of German-Jewish descent
Conservative Party (UK) MPs for English constituencies
UK MPs 1924–1929
1935 deaths
Hunting accident deaths
Alumni of New College, Oxford
Politics of the Borough of Great Yarmouth
Essex Yeomanry officers
Jewish British politicians
British Army personnel of World War I
Royal Corps of Signals officers
Accidental deaths in the United Kingdom